The first season of Doctor Doctor (known as The Heart Guy outside of Australasia), an Australian drama television series, premiered on Nine Network on 14 September 2016.

Cast

Main 
 Rodger Corser as Hugh Knight 
 Nicole da Silva as Charlie Knight (née Pereira)
 Ryan Johnson as Matt Knight
 Tina Bursill as Meryl Knight
 Hayley McElhinney as Penny Cartwright
 Chloe Bayliss as Hayley Mills Knight
 Matt Castley as Ajax Cross Knight
 Belinda Bromilow as Betty Bell
 Shalom Brune-Franklin as Aoife 
 Charles Wu as Ken Liu
 Steve Bisley as Jim Knight

Recurring and guest

 Zoe Carides as Jill (2 episodes)
 Michelle Lim Davidson (2 episodes) 
 Wadih Dona as Dr. Ogilvy (2 episodes)
 John Batchelor as Nathan (6 episodes) 
 Winta McGrath as Floyd (6 episodes)
 Dave Eastgate as Joey (7 episodes)
 Michael Kotsohilis as Fifo Jazz (2 episodes)
 Amy Kersey as Jane (2 episodes)
 Jacek Koman as Trevor (2 episodes)
 Patrick Wilson as Rod Eagle (5 episodes)
 Lucy Durack as Tugger (6 episodes)
 Patrick Diggins as Anton (2 episodes)

Episodes

Reception

Ratings

Accolades 

Casting Guild of Australia (2016)
 Nominated: CGA Award for Best Casting in a TV Drama — Kirsty McGregor
AACTA Awards (2017)
 Nominated: AACTA Award for Best Guest or Supporting Actress in a Television Drama — Tina Bursill 
Logie Awards (2017)
 Nominated: Gold Logie Award for Most Popular Personality on Australian Television — Rodger Corser 
 Nominated: Logie Award for Best Actor — Rodger Corser
 Nominated: Logie Award for Most Outstanding Actor — Rodger Corser 
 Nominated: Logie Award for Most Outstanding Supporting Actor — Ryan Johnson
 Nominated: Logie Award for Best New Talent — Shalom Brune-Franklin
 Nominated: Logie Award for Best Drama Program — Doctor Doctor
Screen Producers Australia (2017)
 Nominated: SPA Award for Drama Series Production of the Year – Doctor Doctor
TV Tonight Awards (2017)
 Nominated: TV Tonight Award for Best New Show (Australian) – Doctor Doctor
 Nominated: TV Tonight Award for Best Australian Drama – Doctor Doctor

Home media

International release

Streaming
Season one is available for catch-up streaming in demand via 9Now in Australia, and internationally from Acorn TV in the United States, TVNZ OnDemand in New Zealand and in the United Knigdom it was available via UKTV Play, but has since expired.

References

2016 Australian television seasons